Agelaia is a genus of Neotropical social wasps (family Vespidae), with species from Mexico to northern Argentina. Fifteen of the 31 described species are found in Brazil. These species are swarm founders that nest in cavities. The nest generally is without an envelope.

The genus includes the species A. vicina that sometimes nests in attics in São Paulo, Brazil, and requires the services of the fire department for removal of the colony that can number more than 1,000,000 stinging wasps. It also includes A. pallipes that is a ground-nesting species found in South America and is considered one of the most aggressive wasps in the region.

These wasps are considered aggressive compared to other wasp species, and inflict a painful sting. The main component of the venom is Agelotoxin, a Phospholipase A2 direct haemolysin, which may cause a severe reaction in some patients.

References 

 Zucchi, R., Sakagami, S. F., Noll, F. B., Mechi, M. R., Mateus, S., Baio, M. V., et al. (1995). Agelaia vicina, a swarm-founding polistine with the largest colony size among wasps and bees (Hymenoptera: Vespidae). Journal of the New York Entomological Society, 103(2), 129–137.
 Hermes Marcel Gustavo, Köhler Andreas. The genus Agelaia Lepeletier (Hymenoptera, Vespidae, Polistinae) in Rio Grande do Sul, Brazil. Rev. Bras. entomol.  [serial on the Internet]. 2004  Mar [cited 2008  May  17] ;  48(1): 135–138. 

Vespidae
Taxa named by Amédée Louis Michel le Peletier